Rohrai is a town in the tehsil of Rewari, Rewari District, in the Gurgaon Division of the state of Haryana, India.

References 

Villages in Rewari district